Anastasia Sinitsyna (born ; September 3, 1983) is a Russian female handballer, who plays for Kastamonu Bld. GSK and the Russian national team.

Sinitsyna played in her country for Rostselmash Rostov (2001–2002) and  Rostov-Don (2002–2007) before she moved in 2007  to Ukraine to join HC Galychanka, where she was two seasons. In 2008, she returned home and played for HC Kuban Krasnodar (2008–2010). In 2011, Sinitsyna transferred to the Ankara-based team Maliye Milli Piyango SK to play in the Turkish Women's Handball Super League. After one season, she joined Maltepe Bld. GSK in Istanbul. From 2015 on, she is with Kastamonu Bld. GSK.

References

1983 births
Sportspeople from Rostov-on-Don
Russian female handball players
Russian expatriate sportspeople in Ukraine
Russian expatriate sportspeople in Turkey
Expatriate handball players in Turkey
Kastamonu Bld. SK (women's handball) players
Living people